Félicien Marceau (16 September 1913 – 7 March 2012) was a French novelist, playwright and essayist originally from Belgium. His real name was Louis Carette. He was close to the Hussards right-wing literary movement, which in turn was close to the monarchist movement . He was born in Kortenberg, Flemish Brabant.

Marceau received the Prix Goncourt for his book Creezy in 1969. On 27 November 1975 he was elected to the Académie française, succeeding Marcel Achard. In 1974, Goudji created the academician's sword for Félicien Marceau.

Bibliography 
1948 , novel
1949 , essay
1951 , novel
1951 , novel (Gallimard )
1952 , novel
1953 , stories (Calmann-Lévy)
1953 , one-act play (Fayard)
1953 , novel
1954 , three-act play
1955 , essay
1955 , novel
1957 , stories
1957 , two part play
1959 , two-act play
1960 , one-act play
1960 , two-act play
1962 , two-act play
1964 , two-act play
1965 , two-act play
1967 , play (Denoël)
1967 , two-act play
1968 , mémoires (Gallimard )
1969 , two-act play
1969 , novel
1971 Preface to Blazac's Le Père Goriot
1972 , two-act play (Gallimard )
1972 , five-act play
1975 , novel
1975 , two-act play (L’Avant-Scène)
1977 , essay
1977  
1978 , play after the adaption of Giorgio Strehler 
1979 , two-act play
1983 , essay
1984 , novel (Gallimard )
1985   (La Différence)
1987 , novel
1989 , novel (Gallimard )
1992 , stories  (Gallimard )
1993  
1994   (Les Belles-Lettres)
1997 , novel
1998 , fables
1998 , interviews with Charles Dantzig 
2000 , novel
2002  

Filmography 
Three Girls in Paris, directed by Gabriel Axel (1963, based on the short story Trois de perdues)
La Bonne Soupe, directed by Robert Thomas (1964, based on the play La Bonne Soupe)
L'Œuf, directed by Jean Herman (1972, based on the play L'Œuf)
Creezy, directed by Pierre Granier-Deferre (1974, based on the novel Creezy)
Body of My Enemy, directed by Henri Verneuil (1976, based on the novel Le Corps de mon ennemi)

Screenwriter 
The Three Thieves, directed by Lionello De Felice (1954)
Love and the Frenchwoman, anthology film, episode: "L'Enfance", directed by Henri Decoin (1960)
The Seven Deadly Sins, anthology film, 2 episodes: "L'Orgueil", directed by Roger Vadim, and "L'Avarice", directed by Claude Chabrol (1962)
Une blonde comme ça, directed by Jean Jabely (1962)

References

External links
  L'Académie française

1913 births
2012 deaths
20th-century French dramatists and playwrights
20th-century French novelists
21st-century French novelists
Belgian collaboration during World War II
French male novelists
Members of the Académie Française
Officers of the Ordre national du Mérite
People from Kortenberg
Prix Goncourt winners
Prix Interallié winners
Grand prix Jean Giono recipients
20th-century French male writers
21st-century French male writers
Belgian emigrants to France